Lawndale is a city in Los Angeles County, California, United States. The population was 32,769 at the 2010 census, up from 31,712 according to the 2000 census. The city is in the South Bay region of the Greater Los Angeles Area.

History

From the 1780s onward, the area that is now Lawndale was part of the Rancho Sausal Redondo, a land grant given by the Spanish colonial government that includes much of what is now the South Bayshore region. In 1905, Charles B. Hopper first subdivided the area and named it after the Chicago neighborhood of the same name. Lots sold slowly and different promotions were tried, such as promoting Lawndale as a chicken raising area. The first railway to run through Lawndale was the Inglewood Division of the Redondo Railway which would later become part of the Pacific Electric "Red Car" system. It ran down the middle of Railway Avenue (now Hawthorne Boulevard) until 1933. In 1927, the Santa Fe railroad arrived. After World War II, the immense demand for housing from returning veterans and California newcomers resulted in Lawndale's formation as a bedroom community. On December 28, 1959, it was incorporated as a city.

Starting in the 1970s, Lawndale's relatively low housing prices but more desirable location relative to its neighboring cities attracted absentee landlords and a substantial portion of its residents increasingly became renters.

For a time in the 1980s, with new cycle of expansion of defense industry nearby, many young people who wished to live in the Beach Cities found that they simply could not afford to do so, and settled in less glamorous inland cities such as Lawndale. But with the contraction of this industry after the cold war, Lawndale reverted to its previous pattern. Lawndale has attempted to attract more owner–residents, as well as tourists, with the 2003 completion of the "Beautify Lawndale" urban renewal project along the city's stretch of Hawthorne Boulevard (State Route 107), a major South Bay thoroughfare.

A large electronic billboard was installed and began running advertising in 2004 until it was realized that the sign violated a city ordinance prohibiting advertising of out-of-town businesses on signs of that nature. For its first 18 months, the sign was sponsored by Fox and promoted upcoming television shows and movies under the Fox label. It later gained and lost a sponsorship with Acura before its current sponsorship for Los Angeles radio station 100.3 – The Sound. The billboard is said to generate Lawndale $200,000 annually. In 2012, the Lawndale community center opened its doors.

Roy Rogers lived there for a time and Fred Dryer was raised there. Traci Lords lived in Lawndale near the beginning of her adult film career.

Economy

Top employers
According to the city's 2009 Comprehensive Annual Financial Report, the top employers in the city are:

Media
Lawndale Community Cable Television on Channel 22 is a Public-access television cable TV station. The City of Lawndale's Cable Television Department is funded by the Lawndale Cable Usage Corporation and the City of Lawndale through Local Access Fees and Cable television franchise fee provided by the local cable company, Time Warner Cable. The Lawndale Cable Usage Corporation is the non-profit, California corporation that receives these fees, and provides for the development of Lawndale Community Cable Television.

The Lawndalian a citywide newsletter that informs the residents about programs and events happening in the City of Lawndale. The Lawndalian is now available Online at the city's website.

The Lawndale Tribune is the community paper for the City of Lawndale.

Government

Municipal government
Harold Hofmann served as mayor for 23 years, due to there not being city term limits and running unopposed in most elections.

State and federal representation

Infrastructure
The Los Angeles County Sheriff's Department (LASD) operates the Lennox Station in Lennox, serving Lawndale. In addition the agency operates the City of Lawndale
Sheriff's Department Service Center.

The United States Postal Service Lawndale Post Office is located at 4320 Marine Avenue.

The Los Angeles County Department of Health Services operates the Curtis Tucker Health Center in Inglewood, serving Lawndale.

The County of Los Angeles Public Library Lawndale Library is located 14615 Burin Ave.

Education
Lawndale Elementary School District
Will Rogers Middle School serving 6th, 7th and 8th grades
Jane Addams Middle School serving 6th, 7th, and 8th grades.
F.D.R Elementary School
William Anderson Elementary School
William Green Elementary School
Mark Twain Elementary School
Billy Mitchell Elementary School
Lucille J. Smith Elementary School

Centinela Valley Union High School District
 Lawndale High School
 Leuzinger High School
 Hawthorne High School
 Lloyde High School

Environmental Charter High School is a charter school in Lawndale serving grades 9 through 12.

In 2009, the renovated Lawndale Public Library of the County of Los Angeles Public Library, which is located adjacent to the Lawndale City Hall, re-opened.

Geography

Lawndale is bordered by Redondo Beach on the west and southwest, Hawthorne on the north, Torrance on the southeast, and the unincorporated area of El Camino Village (also known as Alondra Park) on the east.

Lawndale is serviced by Interstate 405, Hawthorne Boulevard (State Route 107), and by Artesia Boulevard (State Route 91), which becomes a freeway farther east. Lawndale is 5.7 miles southeast of Los Angeles International Airport.

Lawndale is serviced by following public transit: the Lawndale Beat, the Gardena Bus 1, Metro Green Line and by Metro buses 211, 40 and 740, the latter two of which are operated by the Los Angeles County Metropolitan Transportation Authority. The Lawndale Beat bus has been suspended until further notice.

The weather is warm all year long. In the winter, there are moderate rains. Because of the formation of the Palos Verdes Peninsula and its proximity to the beach, the city gets effects of the marine layer on almost identical, if not slightly lower, levels of nearby beach cities such as Manhattan Beach and El Segundo.

Demographics

2010
At the 2010 census Lawndale had a population of 32,769. The racial makeup of Lawndale was 14,274 (43.6%) White (16.2% Non-Hispanic White), 3,320 (10.1%) African American, 301 (0.9%) Native American, 3,269 (10.0%) Asian, 367 (1.1%) Pacific Islander, 9,374 (28.6%) from other races, and 1,864 (5.7%) from two or more races. Hispanic or Latino of any race were 20,002 persons (61.0%).

The census reported that 32,594 people (99.5% of the population) lived in households, 158 (0.5%) lived in non-institutionalized group quarters, and 17 (0.1%) were institutionalized.

There were 9,681 households, 4,516 (46.6%) had children under the age of 18 living in them, 4,467 (46.1%) were opposite-sex married couples living together, 1,813 (18.7%) had a female householder with no husband present, 881 (9.1%) had a male householder with no wife present.  There were 722 (7.5%) unmarried opposite-sex partnerships, and 64 (0.7%) same-sex married couples or partnerships. 1,758 households (18.2%) were one person and 442 (4.6%) had someone living alone who was 65 or older. The average household size was 3.37.  There were 7,161 families (74.0% of households); the average family size was 3.84.

The age distribution was 8,927 people (27.2%) under the age of 18, 3,744 people (11.4%) aged 18 to 24, 10,541 people (32.2%) aged 25 to 44, 7,301 people (22.3%) aged 45 to 64, and 2,256 people (6.9%) who were 65 or older.  The median age was 31.9 years. For every 100 females, there were 101.3 males.  For every 100 females age 18 and over, there were 100.6 males.

There were 10,151 housing units at an average density of 5,141.9 per square mile, of the occupied units 3,326 (34.4%) were owner-occupied and 6,355 (65.6%) were rented. The homeowner vacancy rate was 1.7%; the rental vacancy rate was 3.8%.  11,606 people (35.4% of the population) lived in owner-occupied housing units and 20,988 people (64.0%) lived in rental housing units.

According to the 2010 United States Census, Lawndale had a median household income of $47,769, with 16.7% of the population living below the federal poverty line.

2000
At the 2000 census there were 31,711 people in 9,555 households, including 7,022 families, in the city. The population density was 16,036.7 inhabitants per square mile (6,183.7/km). The racial makeup of the city was 42.24% White, 12.61% African American, 0.99% Native American, 9.63% Asian, 0.91% Pacific Islander, 27.07% from other races, and 6.55% from two or more races. Hispanic or Latino of any race were 52.08%.

Of the 9,555 households 45.5% had children under the age of 18 living with them, 45.8% were married couples living together, and 26.5% were non-families. 18.8% of households were one person and 4.5% were one person aged 65 or older.  The average household size was 3.31 and the average family size was 3.80.

The age distribution was 31.9% under the age of 18, 10.2% from 18 to 24, 35.8% from 25 to 44, 16.4% from 45 to 64, and 5.6% 65 or older.  The median age was 29 years. For every 100 females, there were 102.3 males.  For every 100 females age 18 and over, there were 99.1 males.

The median household income was $39,012 and the median family income  was $37,909. Males had a median income of $29,033 versus $29,025.00 for females. The per capita income for the city was $13,702.  About 14.3% of families and 17.3% of the population were below the poverty line, including 22.4% of those under age 18 and 6.6% of those age 65 or over.

Since Lawndale has a large amount of elderly residents, the city provides free trips for seniors on its city bus: The Lawndale Beat.  The city also provides a meals on wheels program as well as a seniors travel club.

Notable people

Fred Dryer, NFL player and actor, raised in Lawndale in the 1950s, Lawndale High School alumnus.
Russell Westbrook, NBA player, attended high school in Lawndale Leuzinger High School.
Traci Lords, actress.
Roy Rogers, famed actor and singer in Western-themed movies, radio programs and television shows.
Tiran Porter, bass player for the Doobie Brothers and Moby Grape was raised in Lawndale and attended Leuzinger High School.

International relations

Sister cities
 Cagayan de Oro, Philippines (1986)

References

External links

Lawndale official website

 
Cities in Los Angeles County, California
Incorporated cities and towns in California
South Bay, Los Angeles
1959 establishments in California
Populated places established in 1959